William Sarokin is an American sound engineer. He was nominated for an Academy Award in the category Best Sound Mixing for the film Salt. He has worked on over 80 films since 1984.

Selected filmography
 Salt (2010)
 This Must Be the Place (2011)

References

External links

Year of birth missing (living people)
Living people
American audio engineers